Steve Bunce, nicknamed "Buncey", is a British freelance television and radio sport pundit and newspaper columnist.

Career
He has regularly appeared as a pundit on the BBC sports programme Inside Sport and on BBC Radio Five Live's Fighting Talk. Bunce was the face of boxing on Setanta Sports and headlined his own show, Steve Bunce's Boxing Hour, until June 2009 when the organisation ceased broadcasting in Britain. Despite calls for the popular boxing show to reappear, it failed to materialise until the introduction of Britain's first dedicated boxing channel BoxNation. Once again Bunce became the face of boxing on BoxNation, and the long awaited return of Bunce's Boxing Hour started broadcasting 17 October 2011.

He has a regular column in the magazine Boxing Monthly.

In 2010, he published his debut work of fiction The Fixer.

He currently presents the ESPN UK version of the American sports talk show Pardon the Interruption.

Bunce regularly appears on BBC Radio 5 Live's Fighting Talk and the Steve Bunce Boxing Show on BBC Radio London. Bunce won the FT Champion of Champions final on 19 May 2012, defeating Martin Kelner, Dougie Anderson, and Greg Brady in the process.

Personal life
Born in Camden Town, Bunce currently resides in the North of England with his wife, a former Midlands lacrosse captain, and two children. Apart from sport media, Bunce has been a supporter of fire safety since 2010 because of an incident in his teenage years when his home was set alight because of a carelessly extinguished cigarette in an ashtray. The phrase "put it out, right out" has since become a part of Bunce's intro on Fighting Talk.

Northants rugby controversy
Bunce's eldest son, as of 2013, attended Denstone College and plays in its rugby union first XV squad. The elder Bunce was involved in an incident during the Daily Mail Schools rugby tournament when a Northampton School for Boys player called him "a stupid tit" and then allegedly spat on his wife. However, the Northants school headmaster Rod Goldswain spoke with 5 Live and while he was able to confirm the first part of Bunce's story, he went on to say that the player in question actually spat on the ground and not on Mrs. Bunce, and that said student was given a "dressing down" as a result. Goldswain later apologised for these remarks; Bunce, after generating a minor controversy, admitted that this was "a private matter" that shouldn't have been aired on the 5 January 2013 episode of Fighting Talk and that he should have written to the school about the incident.

References

External links
 
 
 
 

Living people
British sports broadcasters
Boxing writers

English male boxers